In statistics, G-tests are likelihood-ratio or maximum likelihood statistical significance tests that are increasingly being used in situations where chi-squared tests were previously recommended.

The general formula for G is

where  is the observed count in a cell,  is the expected count under the null hypothesis,  denotes the natural logarithm, and the sum is taken over all non-empty cells. Furthermore, the total observed count should be equal to the total expected count:where  is the total number of observations.

G-tests have been recommended at least since the 1981 edition of Biometry, a statistics textbook by Robert R. Sokal and F. James Rohlf.

Derivation
We can derive the value of the G-test from the log-likelihood ratio test where the underlying model is a multinomial model.

Suppose we had a sample  where each  is the number of times that an object of type  was observed. Furthermore, let  be the total number of objects observed.

Heuristically, one can imagine  as continuous and approaching zero, in which case  and terms with zero observations can simply be dropped. However the expected count in each cell must be strictly greater than zero for each cell to apply the method.

Distribution and use
Given the null hypothesis that the observed frequencies result from random sampling from a distribution with the given expected frequencies, the distribution of G is approximately a chi-squared distribution, with the same number of degrees of freedom as in the corresponding chi-squared test.

For very small samples the multinomial test for goodness of fit, and Fisher's exact test for contingency tables, or even Bayesian hypothesis selection are preferable to the G-test. McDonald recommends to always use an exact test (exact test of goodness-of-fit, Fisher's exact test) if the total sample size is less than 1 000 .
There is nothing magical about a sample size of 1 000, it's just a nice round number that is well within the range where an exact test, chi-square test, and G–test will give almost identical  values. Spreadsheets, web-page calculators, and SAS shouldn't have any problem doing an exact test on a sample size of 1 000 .
 — John H. McDonald

Relation to the chi-squared test
The commonly used chi-squared tests for goodness of fit to a distribution and for independence in contingency tables are in fact approximations of the log-likelihood ratio on which the G-tests are based.

The general formula for Pearson's chi-squared test statistic is

The approximation of G by chi squared is obtained by a second order Taylor expansion of the natural logarithm around 1. To see this consider 
 
and let  with  so that the total number of counts remains the same. Upon substitution we find,
 
A Taylor expansion around  can be performed using . The result is
 and distributing terms we find,
 
Now, using the fact that  and  we can write the result,
 
This shows that  when the observed counts  are close to the expected counts  When this difference is large, however, the  approximation begins to break down. Here, the effects of outliers in data will be more pronounced, and this explains the why  tests fail in situations with little data. 

For samples of a reasonable size, the G-test and the chi-squared test will lead to the same conclusions. However, the approximation to the theoretical chi-squared distribution for the G-test is better than for the Pearson's chi-squared test. In cases where  for some cell case the G-test is always better than the chi-squared test.

For testing goodness-of-fit the G-test is infinitely more efficient than the chi squared test in the sense of Bahadur, but the two tests are equally efficient in the sense of Pitman or in the sense of Hodges and Lehmann.

Relation to Kullback–Leibler divergence
The G-test statistic is proportional to the Kullback–Leibler divergence of the theoretical distribution from the empirical distribution:

Relation to mutual information
For analysis of contingency tables the value of G can also be expressed in terms of mutual information.

Let

Then G can be expressed in several alternative forms:

where the entropy of a discrete random variable  is defined as

and where

is the mutual information between the row vector r and the column vector c of the contingency table.

It can also be shown that the inverse document frequency weighting commonly used for text retrieval is an approximation of G applicable when the row sum for the query is much smaller than the row sum for the remainder of the corpus.  Similarly, the result of Bayesian inference applied to a choice of single multinomial distribution for all rows of the contingency table taken together versus the more general alternative of a separate multinomial per row produces results very similar to the G statistic.

Application
 The McDonald–Kreitman test in statistical genetics is an application of the G-test.
 Dunning introduced the test to the computational linguistics community where it is now widely used.

Statistical software
 In R fast implementations can be found in the AMR and Rfast packages. For the AMR package, the command is g.test which works exactly like chisq.test from base R. R also has the likelihood.test  function in the Deducer  package. Note: Fisher's G-test in the GeneCycle Package of the R programming language (fisher.g.test) does not implement the G-test as described in this article, but rather Fisher's exact test of Gaussian white-noise in a time series.
 Another R implementation to compute the G statistic and corresponding p-values is provided by the R package entropy. The commands are Gstat for the standard G statistic and the associated p-value and Gstatindep for the G statistic applied to comparing joint and product distributions to test independence.
 In SAS, one can conduct G-test by applying the /chisq option after the proc freq.
 In Stata, one can conduct a G-test by applying the lr option after the tabulate command.
 In Java, use org.apache.commons.math3.stat.inference.GTest.
 In Python, use scipy.stats.power_divergence with lambda_=0.

References

External links
 G2/Log-likelihood calculator

Statistical tests for contingency tables